William Edgar Haymond House is a historic home located at Sutton, Braxton County, West Virginia. It was designed in 1894, and is a -story wood-frame dwelling in the Queen Anne-style.  It sits on a sandstone foundation and features a porch supported by four round Doric order columns.  Also on the property is a garage dated to the 1920s.

It was listed on the National Register of Historic Places in 2006.

References

Houses on the National Register of Historic Places in West Virginia
Queen Anne architecture in West Virginia
Houses completed in 1894
Houses in Braxton County, West Virginia
National Register of Historic Places in Braxton County, West Virginia